George Randolph Hearst III (born 1955) is the publisher and CEO of the Times Union newspaper in Albany, New York, and a director of the Hearst Corporation.

He is the second child of George Randolph Hearst Jr. and Mary Astrid Thompson and great-grandson of William Randolph Hearst. Hearst graduated from Pepperdine University in 1977. He was previously the director of operations of the Times Union and then its associate publisher and general manager. He is the chairman of the board of trustees of the Albany Institute of History & Art, a member of the board of directors of the Saratoga Performing Arts Center and St. Peter's Health Care Services, a hospital in Albany. He sued the producer of the "reality-TV" movie Hopelessly Rich, which aired on VH1 in 2003, over his portrayal in the made-for-TV movie by a con man who had stolen his identity and impersonated Hearst to the producers. He is part of the ownership group of the Albany Empire of the Arena Football League, which began play in 2018.

References

External links
 George R. Hearst III Promoted to Vice President, Associate Publisher, and General Manager of the Albany Times-Union – Hearst Corporation press release

1955 births
Living people
George Randolph III
Businesspeople from Albany, New York
Publishers from California
American publishers (people)
American billionaires
20th-century American businesspeople
Arena Football League executives

Pepperdine University alumni